Oszkár Abay-Nemes (22 September 1913 in Sládkovičovo – 30 January 1959) was a Hungarian swimmer who competed in the 1936 Summer Olympics.

In the 1936 Olympics, he won a bronze medal in the 4 × 200 m freestyle relay event. He was also seventh in his semifinal of the 100 m freestyle event and did not advance.

External links
profile

1913 births
1959 deaths
People from Galanta District
Sportspeople from the Trnava Region
Members of the National Assembly of Hungary (1947–1949)
Hungarian male swimmers
Olympic swimmers of Hungary
Swimmers at the 1936 Summer Olympics
Olympic bronze medalists for Hungary
Olympic bronze medalists in swimming
Hungarian male freestyle swimmers
Medalists at the 1936 Summer Olympics